One Night Only may refer to:

 For One Night Only (TV series), an Irish light entertainment show hosted by Gay Byrne
 For One Night Only (album), a Terrorvision album

See also
 One Night Only (disambiguation)
 One Night (disambiguation)